Kevin James (born 1983) is a Welsh international lawn bowler and former British champion.

Bowls career
James is a four times National champion, after winning the Welsh National Bowls Championships singles in 2006, 2018 and 2021 and the pairs in 2013. The 2021 victory brought him level (in 2nd place) with Robert Weale in winning three singles titles, only one behind Teddy Jones.

After the 2006 victory he subsequently won the singles at the British Isles Bowls Championships in 2007.

In 2015 he won the fours bronze medal at the Atlantic Bowls Championships.

References

1983 births
Living people
Welsh male bowls players